Dan Paladin (born September 14, 1979), also known as Synj, is an American video game artist, designer, and co-founder of the video game company The Behemoth.

He began collaborating with Newgrounds creator Tom Fulp and in the early 2000's designed several Flash-based browser games: Sack Smash 2001, Chainsaw the Children, Dad n' Me, and, most notably, Alien Hominid. In 2002, he, Fulp, John Baez, and Brandon LaCava founded the video game company The Behemoth. Paladin designed the critically acclaimed remake of Alien Hominid, as well as the hack-and-slash game Castle Crashers, with his 2D style becoming signature for these games.

Aside from working for The Behemoth, Paladin has also worked for Gratuitous Games and Presto Studios. He also composed the polka-style closing credits tune for the Cyanide & Happiness animated shorts.

Personal life
Paladin lives in San Diego, California, where The Behemoth is located. He was an active member of Newgrounds.

Awards
Castle Crashers, a game Paladin is credited as the art director of, won two awards in Independent Games Festival 2007: "Excellence In Visual Art" and "Audience Award".

References

External links
Dan Paladin's profile at Newgrounds
Paladin's site
Some of Paladin's sketches on Castle Crashers

American video game designers
21st-century American businesspeople
1979 births
Living people
People from Ohio
Indie video game developers
The Behemoth
Newgrounds people